Dora Boyd de Perez Balladares (born October 11, 1948) is the wife of Panamanian President Ernesto Pérez Balladares, who held the office 1994-99. During this time, she served as First Lady of Panama.

References 

Living people
First ladies and gentlemen of Panama
1948 births